Federica Abbate (born in 1991) is an Italian composer, lyricist and singer-songwriter.

Life and career 
Abbate started playing piano at 5 years old and graduated in sociology. In 2013 she won a contest for songwriters promoted by SIAE and by the Comune of Genoa, "Genova per voi", and got a contract with Universal Music Group.

Abbate wrote over 100 songs, including successful hits the diamond certified hits "Roma-Bangkok" for Baby K and Giusy Ferreri, "L'amore Eternit" for Fedez and Noemi. As a singer, Abbate featured "In radio" by  Marracash, with whom she also toured, and with Baby K on "Chiudo gli occhi e salto", later certified gold by Fimi.  She was also vocal coach in the Rai 2 musical reality show The Voice. Her song "Nessun grado di separazione", performed by Francesca Michielin, placed second at the 66th edition of the Sanremo Music Festival and was Italy's entry at the Eurovision Song Contest 2016. In 2016 she also wrote songs for Elodie, Fiorella Mannoia, Arisa, Gué Pequeno and Marracash.

During 2017 Abbate was the lyrichist of Michele Bravi's "Il Diario degli Errori" for Sanremo Music Festival 2017 and "Semplice" for Elodie, soundtrack for Federico Moccia's film Non c'è Campo. She wrote "Dopotutto", debut single by Federica Carta, multi-platinum single "Voglio ballare con te" for Baby K and Andres Dvicio, and several singles for J-Ax, Fedez, Arisa, Giusy Ferreri and Emis Killa. In September 2017 Federica releases her debut solo single Fiori Sui Balconi.

In January 2018 Abbate took part at Sanremo Giovani, for young Italian songwriters and singers, reaching the second position and winning the Critics' Award. On May 18, 2018 Abbate published her first EP, In foto vengo male, anticipated by "Pensare troppo mi fa male", in collaboration with Marracash. She also collaborated on Carl Brave "La Cuenta", which entered at position 46 of the Italian Singles Chart. In 2018 Abbate also wrote songs with Emma Marrone, Alessandra Amoroso and Gemitaiz. She wrote successful summer singles, including "Amore e Capoeira" for Giusy Ferreri and Takagi & Ketra, "Non ti dico no" for Loredana Bertè and Boomdabash, "Vivere tute le Vite" with Elisa and Eros Ramazzotti "Per le strade una canzone".

In 2019 Abbate wrote several italian hits for Boomdabash, including "Per un milione", "Mambo salentino" (with Alessandra Amoroso), "Ti volevo dedicare" (with J-Ax and Rocco Hunt). She composed "Arrogante" for Amici di Maria De Filippi's winner Irama, "Jambo" for Giusy Ferreri, Takagi & Ketra and Omi, "Una volta ancora" for Fred La Palma and spanish singer Ana Mena, "Playa" by Baby K. She also worked with Fiorella Mannoia, Paola Turci and Fedez. In 2019 Abbate was also selected by Sanremo Giovani with "I sogni prima di dormire", but she was eliminated. On May 21, 2019, Abbate released the collaboration "Camera con vista" with Lorenzo Fragola.

In 2020 she wrote "Invincibile" with Alberto Urso and "Niente canzoni d'Amore" for Elodie's third studio album This is Elodie.

Discography

EP 

 2018 – In foto vengo male

Single 

 2013 – Dammi ancora
 2017 – Fiori sui balconi
 2018 – Mi contraddico
 2018 – Pensare troppo mi fa male (con Marracash)
 2018 – Finalmente
 2019 – Quando un desiderio cade
 2019 – Camera con vista (with Lorenzo Fragola)

As a featured artist 

 2015 – In radio (con Marracash)
 2015 – Chiudo gli occhi e salto (with Baby K)
 2016 – Niente canzoni d'amore (with Marracash)
 2018 – Un'estate al mare (with i Selton)
 2018 – La cuenta (with Carl Brave and Franco126)

References

External links 
  
 Federica Abbate at Discogs

Musicians from Milan
1991 births
Italian pop singers
Italian songwriters
Italian lyricists
Living people
21st-century Italian singers
21st-century Italian women singers